Katrin Šmigun (born 21 October 1979) is an Estonian cross-country skier. She competed at the 1998 Winter Olympics and the 2002 Winter Olympics.

Cross-country skiing results
All results are sourced from the International Ski Federation (FIS).

Olympic Games

World Championships

a.  Cancelled due to extremely cold weather.

World Cup

Season standings

References

External links
 

1979 births
Living people
Estonian female cross-country skiers
Olympic cross-country skiers of Estonia
Cross-country skiers at the 1998 Winter Olympics
Cross-country skiers at the 2002 Winter Olympics
Sportspeople from Tartu